Sino Hotels (Holdings) Limited is a hotel operator based in Hong Kong but incorporated in the Cayman Islands. It is affiliated with Sino Land Company Limited in Hong Kong and the Far East Organization in Singapore.

Hotels

Hong Kong
Sino Hotels operate 6 hotels in HK :
 City Garden Hotel
 Hong Kong Gold Coast Hotel
 Gold Cost Yacht and Country Club
 Island Pacific Hotel
 The Royal Pacific Hotel and Towers Hong Kong
 The Olympian Hong Kong
 The Pottinger Hong Kong

Singapore
In Singapore, Sino Hotels operate the Fullerton brand :
 Fullerton Hotel
 Fullerton Bay Hotel

Australia
In Australia, Sino Hotels operate one hotel in Sydney.

The Fullerton, Martin Place, Sydney

Board members
Sino Hotels' board consists of 8 directors including the chairman, Robert Ng.

Executive Directors
 Robert Ng Chee Siong (Chairman)
Daryl Ng Win Kong, the eldest son of chairman Robert Ng, (Deputy Chairman)

Non-Executive Directors
 Ronald Joseph Arculli
 Gilbert Lui Wing Kwong

Independent Non-Executive Directors
 Peter Wong Man Kong
 Steven Ong Kay Eng
 Wong Cho Bau

References

External links
 Sino Hotels official website
 The Pottinger official website

Companies listed on the Hong Kong Stock Exchange
Offshore companies of the Cayman Islands
Hotels established in 1994
Sino Group
Hotel chains in China
Hospitality companies of Hong Kong
Hospitality companies of Singapore
Hotel chains in Singapore